Sarang Rawat (born 9 November 1995) is an Indian first-class cricketer who plays for Delhi. He made his Twenty20 debut on 4 January 2016 in the 2015–16 Syed Mushtaq Ali Trophy.

References

External links
 

1995 births
Living people
Indian cricketers
Delhi cricketers
Cricketers from Delhi